Kenet is a village in Kuhestan Rural District, in the Central District of Behshahr County, Mazandaran Province, Iran. At the 2006 census, its population was 87, in 23 families.

References 

Populated places in Behshahr County